Elizabeth Laura Adams (1909–1982) was an African-American Catholic writer, best known for her autobiography Dark Symphony (1942).

Early life 
Elizabeth Laura Adams was born in Santa Barbara, California on February 9, 1909 to Lula Josphine and Daniel Adams, Adams grew up in the Depression era. After her father's death, Adams converted to Catholicism.

Reception 
Reception of Dark Symphony was very good, with it being a bestseller among Catholics.

Works
 Consecrated (1936)
 The Country Doctor (1942)
 The Art of Living Joyfully (1942)
 Dark Symphony (1942)
 Children under Fire (1943)

References 

1909 births
1982 deaths
African-American women writers
Roman Catholic writers
African-American Roman Catholicism
African-American Catholics
20th-century African-American women
20th-century African-American people
People from Santa Barbara, California
20th-century American people
American autobiographers